In the Islamic and Christian traditions, the Seven Sleepers, otherwise known as the Sleepers of Ephesus and Companions of the Cave, is a medieval legend about a group of youths who hid inside a cave outside the city of Ephesus (modern-day Selçuk, Turkey) around AD 250 to escape one of the Roman persecutions of Christians and emerged some 300 years later. Another version of the story appears in the Quran (18:9–26). It was also translated into Persian, Kyrgyz, and Tatar.

The earliest version of this story comes from the Syriac bishop Jacob of Serugh (–521), which is itself derived from an earlier Greek source, now lost. An outline of this tale appears in the writings of Gregory of Tours (538–594) and in History of the Lombards of Paul the Deacon (720–799). The best-known Western version of the story appears in Jacobus de Voragine's Golden Legend (1259–1266).  See BHO (Pueri septem) ##1012-1022; BHG (Pueri VII) ##1593–1599; BHL Dormientes (Septem) Ephesi ##2313–2319.

Accounts are found in at least nine medieval languages and preserved in over 200 manuscripts, mainly dating to between the 9th and 13th centuries. These include 104 Latin manuscripts, 40 Greek, 33 Arabic, 17 Syriac, six Ethiopic, five Coptic, two Armenian, one Middle Irish, and one Old English. It was also translated into Sogdian. In the 13th century, the poet Chardri composed an Old French version.

The Roman Martyrology mentions the Seven Sleepers of Ephesus under the date of 27 July (June according to Vatican II calendar). The Byzantine calendar commemorates them with feasts on 4 August and 22 October. The ninth-century Irish calendar  commemorates the Seven Sleepers on 7 August. Syriac Orthodox calendars gives various dates: 21 April, 2 August, 13 August, 23 October and 24 October.

Number, duration and names
Early versions do not all agree on or even specify the number of sleepers. The Jews and the Christians of Najran believed in only three brothers; the East Syriac, five. Most Syriac accounts have eight, including a nameless watcher which God sets over the sleepers. However, in Islam their specific number is not mentioned. Qur'an 18:22 discusses the disputes regarding their numbers. The verse says:

Some will say, "They were three, their dog was the fourth," while others will say, "They were five, their dog was the sixth," only guessing blindly. And others will say, "They were seven and their dog was the eighth." Say, O Prophet, "My Lord knows best their exact number. Only a few people know as well." So do not argue about them except with sure knowledge, nor consult any of those who debate about them.

This verse rejects the first two claims as "guessing at the unseen". But it leaves the third claim of the number of the sleepers being seven and their dog being their eighth unchallenged.

Regarding "only a few people know", Abdullah Ibn Abbas, one of the companions of Muhammad, is reported to say in an authentic narration reported in the tafseer of the verse in Tafseer At Tabari, "I'm from those a few whose exception Allah has made. And their number is seven."

The number of years the sleepers slept also varies between accounts. The highest number, given by Gregory of Tours, was 373 years. Some accounts have 372. Jacobus de Voragine calculated it at 196 (from the year 252 until 448). Other calculations suggest 195. Islamic accounts, including the Qur'an, give a sleep of 309 years. These are presumably lunar years, which would make it 300 solar years. Qur'an 18:25 says, "And they remained in their cave for three hundred years and exceeded by nine."

Bartłomiej Grysa lists at least seven different sets of names for the sleepers:
 Maximian, Martinian, Dionisius, John, Constantine, Malchus, Serapion
 Maximilian, Martinian, Dionisius, John, Constantine, Malkhus, Serapion, Anthony
 Maximilian, Martinian, Dionisius, John, Constantine, Yamblikh (Iamblichus), Anthony
 Makṯimilīnā (Maksimilīnā, Maḥsimilīnā), Marnūš (Marṭūs), Kafašṭaṭyūš (Ksōṭōnos), Yamlīḫā (Yamnīḫ), Mišlīnā, Saḏnūš, Dabranūš (Bīrōnos), Samōnos, Buṭōnos, Qālos (according to aṭ-Ṭabarī and ad-Damīrī)
 Achillides, Probatus, Stephanus, Sambatus, Quiriacus, Diogenus, Diomedes (according to Gregory of Tours)
 Ikilios, Fruqtis, Istifanos, Sebastos, Qiryaqos, Dionisios (according to Michael the Syrian)
 Aršellītīs, Probatios, Sabbastios, Stafanos, Kīriakos, Diōmetios, Avhenios (according to the Coptic version)

Origins
Whether the original account was written in Syriac or Greek was a matter of debate, but today a Greek original is generally accepted. The pilgrim account De situ terrae sanctae, written between 518 and 531, records the existence of a church dedicated to the sleepers in Ephesus.

The story appeared in several Syriac sources before Gregory of Tours's lifetime. The earliest Syriac manuscript copy is in MS Saint-Petersburg No. 4, which dates to the fifth century. It was retold by Symeon the Metaphrast. The Seven Sleepers form the subject of a homily in verse by the Edessan poet-theologian Jacob of Serugh (died 521), which was published in the Acta Sanctorum. Another sixth-century version, in a Syrian manuscript in the British Museum (Cat. Syr. Mss, p. 1090), gives eight sleepers.

Account in the Quran 

This Surah was sent down in answer to the three questions which the mushriks of Makkah, in consultation with the people of the Book, had put to the Holy Prophet in order to test him. These were: (1) Who were "the Sleepers of the Cave"? (2) What is the soul/or made with
(3) What do you know about Zul-Qarnain?

The story of the Companions of the Cave is referred to in Quran 18:9-26. The precise number of the sleepers is not stated. The Quran furthermore points to the fact that people, shortly after the incident emerged, started to make "idle guesses" as to how many people were in the cave. To this the Quran asserts that: "My Sustainer knows best how many they were". Similarly, regarding the exact period of time the people stayed in the cave, the Quran, after asserting the guesswork of the people that "they remained in the cave for 300 years and nine added", resolves that "God knows best how long they remained [there]." According to the 25th verse of Al-Kahf, the Companions of the Cave have slept for 300 years in the solar calendar and slept 309 in the lunar calendar since the lunar calendar is 11 days shorter than the solar, which explains the inclusion of the additional nine years. The Quran says the sleepers included a dog, who sat at the entrance of the cave (verse 18).

Christian story

Story

The story says that during the persecutions by the Roman emperor Decius, around AD 250, seven young men were accused of following Christianity. They were given some time to recant their faith, but they refused to bow to Roman idols. Instead they chose to give their worldly goods to the poor and retire to a mountain cave to pray, where they fell asleep. The Emperor, seeing that their attitude towards paganism had not improved, ordered the mouth of the cave to be sealed.

Decius died in 251, and many years passed during which Christianity went from being persecuted to being the state religion of the Roman Empire. At some later time—usually given as during the reign of Theodosius II (408–450)—in AD 447 when heated discussions were taking place between various schools of Christianity about the resurrection of the body in the day of judgement and life after death, a landowner decided to open up the sealed mouth of the cave, thinking to use it as a cattle pen. He opened it and found the sleepers inside. They awoke, imagining that they had slept but one day, and sent one of their number to Ephesus to buy food, with instructions to be careful.

Upon arriving in the city, this person was astounded to find buildings with crosses attached; the townspeople for their part were astounded to find a man trying to spend old coins from the reign of Decius. The bishop was summoned to interview the sleepers; they told him their miracle story, and died praising God. The various lives of the Seven Sleepers in Greek are listed and in other non-Latin languages at BHO.

Dissemination
The story rapidly attained a wide diffusion throughout Christendom. It was popularized in the West by Gregory of Tours, in his late 6th-century collection of miracles, De gloria martyrum (Glory of the Martyrs). Gregory claimed to have gotten the story from "a certain Syrian interpreter" (Syro quidam interpretante), but this could refer to either a Syriac- or Greek-speaker from the Levant. During the period of the Crusades, bones from the sepulchres near Ephesus, identified as relics of the Seven Sleepers, were transported to Marseille, France, in a large stone coffin, which remained a trophy of the Abbey of St Victor, Marseille.

The Seven Sleepers were included in the Golden Legend compilation, the most popular book of the later Middle Ages, which fixed a precise date for their resurrection, AD 478, in the reign of Theodosius.

Caves of the Seven Sleepers
Several sites are attributed as the "Cave of the Seven Sleepers", but none have been archaeologically proven to be the actual site. As the earliest versions of the legend spread from Ephesus, an early Christian catacomb came to be associated with it, attracting scores of pilgrims. On the slopes of Mount Pion (Mount Coelian) near Ephesus (near modern Selçuk in Turkey), the grotto of the Seven Sleepers with ruins of the religious site built over it was excavated in 1926–1928. The excavation brought to light several hundred graves dated to the 5th and 6th centuries. Inscriptions dedicated to the Seven Sleepers were found on the walls and in the graves. This grotto is still shown to tourists.

Other possible sites of the cave of the Seven Sleepers are in Afşin and Tarsus, Turkey. Afşin is near the antique Roman city of Arabissus, to which the East Roman Emperor Justinian paid a visit. The Emperor brought marble niches as gifts from Western Turkey for the site, which are preserved inside the Eshab-ı Kehf Kulliye mosque to this day. The site was a Hittite temple, used as a Roman temple and later as a church in Roman and Byzantine times. The Seljuks continued to use the place of worship as a church and a mosque. It was turned into a mosque over time with the conversion of the local population to Islam.

There is a cave near Amman, Jordan, also known as the cave of seven sleepers, which has eight smaller sealed tombs present inside and a ventilation duct coming out of the cave.

Modern literature

Early modern

The account had become proverbial in 16th century Protestant culture. The poet John Donne could ask,

        I wonder, by my troth, what thou and I
        Did, till we loved? Were we not weaned till then?
        But sucked on country pleasures, childishly?
        Or snorted we in the Seven Sleepers' den?—John Donne, "The Good-Morrow".

In John Heywood's Play called the Four PP (1530s), the Pardoner, a Renaissance update of the protagonist in Chaucer's "The Pardoner's Tale", offers his companions the opportunity to kiss "a slipper / Of one of the Seven Sleepers", but the relic is presented as absurdly as the Pardoner's other offerings, which include "the great-toe of the Trinity" and "a buttock-bone of Pentecost."

Little is heard of the Seven Sleepers during the Enlightenment, but the account revived with the coming of Romanticism. The Golden Legend may have been the source for retellings of the Seven Sleepers in Thomas de Quincey's Confessions of an English Opium-Eater, in a poem by Goethe, Washington Irving's "Rip van Winkle", H. G. Wells's The Sleeper Awakes. It also might have an influence on the motif of the "King asleep in mountain". Mark Twain did a burlesque of the story of the Seven Sleepers in Chapter 13 of Volume 2 of The Innocents Abroad.

Contemporary
Serbian writer Danilo Kiš retells the story of the Seven Sleepers in a short story, "The Legend of the Sleepers" from his book The Encyclopedia of the Dead.

Italian author Andrea Camilleri incorporates the story in his novel The Terracotta Dog, in which the protagonist is led to a cave containing the titular watchdog (as described in the Qur'an and called "Kytmyr" in Sicilian folk-lore) and the saucer of silver coins with which one of the sleepers is to buy "pure food" from the bazaar in Ephesus (Qur'an 18.19). The Seven Sleepers are symbolically replaced by lovers Lisetta Moscato and Mario Cunich, who were killed in their nuptial bed by an assassin hired by Lisseta's incestuous father and later laid to rest in a cave in the Sicilian countryside.

In Susan Cooper's The Dark Is Rising series, Will Stanton awakens the Seven Sleepers in The Grey King, and in Silver on the Tree they ride in the last battle against the Dark.

The Seven Sleepers series by Gilbert Morris takes a modern approach to the story, in which seven teenagers must be awakened to fight evil in a post-nuclear-apocalypse world.

John Buchan refers to the Seven Sleepers in The Three Hostages, where Richard Hannay surmises that his wife Mary, who is a sound sleeper, is descended from one of the seven who has married one of the Foolish Virgins.

Several languages have idioms related to the Seven Sleepers, including:
 Hungarian: hétalvó, literally a "seven-sleeper", or "one who sleeps for an entire week", is a colloquial reference to a person who oversleeps or who is typically drowsy.
 Irish: "Na seacht gcodlatáin" refers to hibernating animals.
 Norwegian: a late riser may be referred to as a syvsover ("seven sleeper")
 Swedish: a late riser may be referred to as a sjusovare ("seven sleeper").
 Welsh: a late riser may be referred to as a saith cysgadur ("seven sleeper") – as in the 1885 novel Rhys Lewis by Daniel Owen, where the protagonist is referred to as such in chapter 37, p. 294 (Hughes a'i Fab, Caerdydd, 1948).

See also
Epimenides
King asleep in mountain
The Men of Angelos
Rip Van Winkle
Seven Sleepers' Day
The Three Sleepers: characters in the C. S. Lewis children's novel The Voyage of the Dawn Treader

References

Further reading

External links

Quran–Authorized English Version The Cave- Sura 18 – Quran – Authorized English Version
 "SS. Maximian, Malchus, Martinian, Dionysius, John, Serapion, and Constantine, Martyrs", Butler's Lives of the Saints
 Text containing the Seven Sleepers' commemoration as part of the Office of Prime.
 Sura al-Kahf at Wikisource
 Photos of the excavated site of the Seven Sleepers cult.
 Gregory of Tours, The Patient Impassioned Suffering of the Seven Sleepers of Ephesus translated by Michael Valerie
 The Lives of the Seven Sleepers from The Golden Legend by Jacobus de Voragine, William Caxton Middle English translation.
 The Seven Sleepers of Ephesus by Chardri, translated into English by Tony Devaney Morinelli: Medieval Sourcebook. fordham.edu

Medieval legends
Legendary Greek people
Saints from Roman Anatolia
Groups of Christian martyrs of the Roman era 
Groups of Roman Catholic saints
Quranic narratives
Sleep in mythology and folklore
3rd-century Christian saints
Rip Van Winkle-type stories
Dogs in religion
Decian dynasty